Xiaohan, is a Singaporean female Chinese pop music lyricist.

Biography
She published her first lyrical work ('義無反顧' performed by 阮丹青) in 1998. Ever since 2000, where she earned a nomination spot in the Singapore Hit Awards with '你抽的煙', Xiaohan has been a consistent nominee in the annual event. She became the first female to be crowned Best Local Lyricist at the Singapore Hit Awards 2002 with '紙飛機'. Xiaohan reclaimed the title again in 2004, with '無底洞'. She held on to the title in 2007, 2008 and 2010 with '雨天' (Performed by Stefanie Sun), '達爾文' and '抛物綫' (Both performed by Tanya Chua) respectively. In addition to the Singapore Hit Awards, Xiaohan's lyrical works were also recognised in Singapore Compass Awards as well as Singapore eAwards. '達爾文' garnered Xiaohan her first regional Best Lyricist nomination in Taiwan's Golden Melody Awards in 2008.

From the Chinese pop music scene, Xiaohan expanded her scope to penning lyrics for musicals. She was also involved in the Speak Mandarin Campaign 2006, a fund-raising album "Hands United" for the 2004 tsunami victims and being a judge in various competitions.

She is currently the co-director of Funkie Monkies Productions with Eric Ng.
With the collaboration of Funkie Monkies Productions with Royston Tan, Xiaohan participated in the making of the soundtracks for Royston Tan's blockbusters, "881" and "12蓮花"  In 2008 and 2009, Xiaohan had the honour of penning the mandarin version of the Singapore National Day theme song, titled '晴空萬里' (performed by Joi Chua) and '就在這裡'(performed by Kelvin Tan) respectively.

Awards and nominations

Representative Lyrical Works
纖維 (林憶蓮)
偉大的渺小 (林俊傑)
紙飛機 (林憶蓮)
詞不達意 (林憶蓮)
為我好 (梁靜茹)
無底洞 (蔡健雅)
達爾文(蔡健雅)
踮起腳尖愛 (洪佩瑜)
平衡感 (Alin)
我的愛(孫燕姿)
雨天 (孫燕姿)
平常心 (張惠妹)
壞的好人 (張惠妹)
We are One (蔡健雅、那英、林憶蓮、張惠妹、楊丞琳、蕭亞軒、Alin、小S)
單 (楊丞琳)
摩天輪 (田馥甄)
一人一半 (伍家輝)
敢傷 (蕭亞軒)
寂寞先生 (曹格)
孤獨患者 (陳奕迅)
淚若雨下 (喬毓明)
 一生一事 (EXO)
 为心導航 (EXO)
 梦想发射计划 (威神V)
 天空海 （威神V）

Representative Literary Works
眼淚是膠囊 (2011)
無指幸福 (2013)
回不去的候車站 (2015)
幸好我不是滿分女生 (2017)

Musicals Involved
老九 (2005, 2012 & 2017) 
快樂 (2005)
聊斋 (2010)

Movie Soundtracks
881 OST 1 & 2
12蓮花 OST
小字條

References

External links
Official website
Funkie Monkies

Razor TV Interview

Cedar Girls' Secondary School alumni
Singaporean composers
Singaporean people of Chinese descent
Living people
Year of birth missing (living people)